The Islands book Trust is a project based on the Hebridean Isle of Lewis, aims to further understanding of the history of Scottish islands in their wider Celtic and Nordic contexts through:
 events including talks, visits, and conferences
 publications
 research and education.

References
 "Island book fest gets under way" BBC

External links
 Organization website

Organisations based in the Outer Hebrides